Speeding Up Time is a 1971 film written and directed by John Evans and starring Winston Thrash and Pamela Donegan.

Premise
A man seeks revenge on the crime boss responsible for the fire that killed his mother.

References

External links

1971 films
1971 action films
American action films
Blaxploitation films
1971 directorial debut films
1970s English-language films
1970s American films